Ric's Art Boat and Ric's River Boat are two boats moored in the port of Brussels, seeking to highlight the artistic activities and events. They support initiatives for social integration and cultural entertainment projects.

History
RIC (Recreative International Center) has been created by the artist Erik Pevernagie in 1973. He was supported by many colleagues and students who live worldwide by now.

They were influenced by the spirit of the late sixties: University of Paris X: Nanterre, Daniel Cohn-Bendit, Berkeley University of California, Herbert Marcuse, Free University of Berlin, Rudi Dutschke.  They supported the Free Speech Movement and had contacts with both French student circles in May 1968 and German reformers (German student movement). Advocating that, at least, one-third of people's existence should be available for creative leisure, Pevernagie insisted on the recreational side in life: time budget saved after work and sleep.

"Imagination being back in power", old values were scrutinized carefully. In view of meeting the recreational demands two floating social and cultural entertainment centers were brought into existence:  Ric's Art Boat and Ric's River Boat.

These boats have since been a meeting place for international artists: filmdirectors (ex. Atom Egoyan, Claude Lelouch, Benoit Lamy, Jan Verheyen (director), visual artists (ex. Luc Tuymans, Nicolas Vial, illustrator of French Newspaper Le Monde), singers (ex.Axelle Red, the Kooks, Tom Barman, Karen Cheryl), authors (Hugo Claus).

Backstory of the boats 
Ric's River Boat is a vessel built by Boele & Zn. Slikkerveer in 1900 as a steam tug Express for Rhine Screw Tug Express NV (A. van Dort ) in Rotterdam. It has a length of 42 meters, a width of 7.50 meters and a tonnage of 387 tons. In 1916 the ship was sold to the Dutch Transport Maatschappij NV in Rotterdam and was called Mimir. After the war the Royal Netherlands Navy in Amsterdam took over authority from the ground troops in 1946. It became host ship Leeuw ( HW 11), for the housing of the  Marines. It was renumbered in 1955 to (A 889). In 1948/1949 been used for accommodating Marva 's ( Female Marines). From 1961-1975 it is used as an institution for  Social Youth Care in Dordrecht and was named Hollands Glorie. It replaced the ship of the same name, the old light vessel Haaksgronden, which had been in use since December 3, 1941.  In 1978, it was handed over to the non-profit organization, RIC, (Recreative International Center) under the name  Ric’s River Boat and moored in the center of Brussels.

It has a length of 38 meters and a tonnage of 370 tons

Artistic Commitment
Being persuaded that art, by its creative power, can unleash positive energy and create closer relations between individuals and peoples, cultural aspects have been highlighted by the organizers. Says Le Soir [1]: “Art is displayed at Ric's Art Boat. An open gallery on the water and the banks of Brussels. In recent years two boats moored at the Quai des Péniches have been multiplying cultural events and festivities.”

Social engagement
Realizing that lack of knowledge can lead to suspicion, cause feelings of isolation, generate an environment of estrangement, unfriendliness or even hostility, they felt the need to express their social concern. Says La Dernière Heure [2]: "The Chairman of Ric's Boats noticed that foreigners settle in Belgium and watch the "natives" "like fish in an aquarium". They are very often surprised by the perplexing behavior of these "local tribes". On the other hand, the flow of aliens is accepted by some natives with reluctance. They are surprised by these new faces that "decorate" or "pollute" their environment and do not like the manners of these intruders. 'So I noticed this double repulsion and thought we had to do something about it. What is lacking is human contact: straight, informal contact without prejudice."

Environmental concern
Having been constantly disfigured by ruthless building promoters and careless politicians, Brussels had become the victim of an irresponsible urban development, the so-called  " Brusselization ".  Ric's organizers thought it was important to find an appropriate mix between the waterline, the glass and concrete townscape and the human presence. Says La Capitale [3] : " One can rediscover a neighborhood, which has been unfairly disregarded in the past: the canal area. At the same time one can rediscover an uncommon spot: "Ric's Art Boat."

Recreation and Entertainment
Besides the artistic, social and environmental activities recreation is regarded by Ric's Art Boat as a vital part of the existence. They feel that leisure, as a means of regeneration and restoration, should be looked after carefully.

Quotes
 "Learning to think internationally, thanks to RIC. Hospitable center in the capital." (De Standaard) [5]
 "Now in its 27th year as a concert hall, the boat is a popular venue with the Brussels in-crowd, who use it for everything from poetry readings and classical concerts to house parties." (The Bulletin) [6]

Bibliography
  Dictionnaire d'Histoire de Bruxelles, Proposon, Bruxelles, 2013, p. 664
  Le Guide des connaisseurs, janvier 1991, n° 144, p. 3
  Reisgids : Neem nou Brussel,Hans De Bruijn en Gerrit Six,Arbeiderspers/A.W. Bruna,Utrecht,1986
  Being Urban,ISELP - CFC Editions, Pauline de La Boulaye & Adrien Grimmereau, p. 49

Notes

  Le Soir 31 October 1996
  La Dernière Heure 15 March 1974
  La Capitale 2003
  De Standaard May 6, 1974
  The Bulletin April 18, 2002

External links
Les Péniches Ric's River Boat et Ric's Art Boat a Bruxelles
Official site

Buildings and structures in Brussels